"Cartman Joins NAMBLA" is the fifth episode of the fourth season of the animated television series South Park, and the 53rd episode of the series overall. Going by production order, it is the 5th episode of Season 4. It originally aired in the United States on June 21, 2000, on Comedy Central.

In the episode, Cartman, in search of more mature friends, accidentally joins the "North American Man/Boy Love Association" (NAMBLA), and puts all the boys of South Park in jeopardy as a result. Meanwhile, Kenny tries to stop his mother and father from having another baby.

Plot

After deciding he is too mature to hang out with Stan, Kyle, and Kenny, Cartman looks for older male friends in an online chat room full of eager men who Cartman believes want to be friends with him. They are actually Internet predators who prey on young boys. Cartman meets one predator at Mel's Diner, who is quickly arrested for soliciting sex from a minor. The next day, Cartman meets another predator who turns out to be Mr. Garrison, who is also arrested.

Cartman doesn't understand why this keeps happening and naively concludes that Stan and Kyle are responsible for the arrests. Cartman visits Dr. Mephesto to ask where he might find mature friends. Dr. Mephesto recommends joining an organization known as NAMBLA.  Cartman joins NAMBLA and is made their poster boy. The organization holds a banquet in Cartman's honor and asks him to invite all the boys in town. Cartman does so, with the exception of Stan and Kyle.

Federal officials, having learned that NAMBLA is meeting in South Park, raid the venue. However, they discover that they have raided Dr. Mephesto's group meeting of the North American Marlon Brando Look-Alikes. The FBI teams up with the Marlon Brando lookalikes (who have been trying to get rid of the other NAMBLA for years) to stop the other NAMBLA's banquet. There, all the boys in town (including Stan and Kyle who were also invited) are in attendance, unaware of what is in store for them until the pedophiles take them to their hotel rooms, after which the boys run screaming in the halls.

Meanwhile, Stuart and Carol McCormick are trying to have another baby. As Kenny does not like the idea, he tries to stop them by throwing a fastball at his father's crotch to shatter his left testicle. When his mother gets pregnant anyway, he adds morning-after pills to a chocolate milk/vodka cocktail and gives it to his mother, who refuses the drink because of her pregnancy. Stuart drinks it and it causes him to vomit and defecate. Later, Kenny convinces his family to go with him to North Park Funland to ride The John Denver Experience, a violent ride not recommended for pregnant women. However, Kenny's father gets a broken nose from the ride and ends up vomiting, defecating, and now, draining his bloody nose into a garbage can. Enraged at his failures, Kenny chases Carol through the town and into the NAMBLA hotel with a plunger, attempting to plunge the fetus out of her. Upon seeing this, Stuart angrily chases after Kenny to stop him from hurting his mother and their unborn child.

The two plots collide when the Marlon Brando look-alikes and the federal officers arrive at the hotel, and a madcap chase with the boys, both NAMBLAs (one of which are running naked), and the feds ensues. Kenny, still chasing after his mother and in turn being chased by his father, joins in. Cartman decides that Butters should be the sacrificial lamb for the pedophiles to have their way with. While Butters is sent into an empty room and leaves unharmed, Stuart enters a room to search for Kenny, only to find the NAMBLA pedophiles, who somehow mistake him for a little boy and proceed to gang-rape him.

In the end, all of the North American Man/Boy Love Association members are arrested by the FBI and they try to weasel their way out of jailtime by giving out a speech equating pedophilia with being an oppressed minority and that they simply cannot help their sexual attraction to young boys. However, Stan and Kyle retort at this by stating that, while they believe in tolerance and equality for all, pedophiles are criminals who hurt children and should be treated as such. As the pedophiles are taken away to custody, Cartman backhandedly apologizes to his friends for almost getting them raped, assuring that they will "blossom into maturity" someday.

The raped Stuart is loaded into an ambulance, which accidentally goes in reverse and runs over Kenny, killing him instantly. Afterwards, Carol gives birth to an identical child they name Kenny, which she says has happened 52 times before.

Production
"Cartman Joins NAMBLA" was written by series co-founders Trey Parker and Matt Stone, was directed by Eric Stough, and was rated TV-MA in the United States and 15 in the United Kingdom.

In 2006, IGN listed the episode as #8 on a list of their 10 Favorite South Park Episodes.

Censorship 
 British satellite channel Sky One banned the episode due to its strong pedophilia references in the main plot, and its subplot where Kenny tried to force the termination of his mother's pregnancy. However, it has been aired on digital channels Comedy Central and MTV UK and terrestrial channels Channel 4 and Viva, and it does appear on the UK DVD release of South Park's fourth season. The episode is also available on the Amazon Prime Video UK streaming service. 
 The scenes of Stuart McCormick repeatedly vomiting and defecating into a toilet and garbage can (in addition to blowing his nose from an excessive nosebleed after riding the John Denver Experience) were removed for syndication in the United States, but have since been reinstated.

References

External links

 "Cartman Joins NAMBLA" Full episode at South Park Studios
 

South Park (season 4) episodes
Cultural depictions of Marlon Brando
Television episodes about pedophilia
Television episodes about child sexual abuse
Television censorship
Television censorship in the United Kingdom